San Miguel District is one of thirteen districts of the province San Miguel in Peru. San Miguel was founded by Francisco Pizarro in 1532 and is thus the oldest European town in Peru.

References